Coleophora brevipalpella is a moth of the family Coleophoridae. It is found from Fennoscandia to the Pyrenees, the Alps and the Carpathian Mountains and from Germany to Romania and North Macedonia.

The larvae feed on Centaurea aspera, Centaurea jacea, Centaurea scabiosa and Serratula tinctoria. It is yellowish white to ochreous brown. The mouth angle is about 45°. Full-grown larvae can be found in June.

References

External links

brevipalpella
Moths of Europe
Moths described in 1874
Moths of Japan